This is a list of expeditions to Mount Everest. Many of these are mountaineering expeditions for exploration, sport, science or fundraising.

Introduction
There have been many expeditions throughout the 20th (1900s) and 21st (2000s) centuries, and the amount increased in the late 20th century.
The first expedition was a reconnaissance expedition in 1921, and after a few decades an expedition in 1953 reached the top of Everest. Everest expeditions, especially in the late 1900s had a certain grandiose reputation, because they were often such large undertakings. The 1953 expedition had 320 porters that carried supplies across a remote wilderness. The 1963 American expedition had over 900 porters that carried over 25 tons of supplies, supporting a climbing crew of dozens.

List

Prior to 1960
1921 British reconnaissance
1922 British
1924 British (Affair of the Dancing Lamas)
1933 British
1935 British reconnaissance
1936 British
1938 British
1951 British reconnaissance
1952 Swiss
1953 British, first successful expedition
Ninth British expedition was led by John Hunt and organized and financed by the Joint Himalayan Committee. Using conventional open-circuit oxygen sets, the summit was eventually reached at 11:30 a.m. local time on May 29, 1953, by the New Zealander Edmund Hillary and Tenzing Norgay, a Nepali, climbing the South Col route. This was the first time men had reached the top of Mount Everest.
1956 Swiss Expedition
A second Swiss expedition, led by Albert Eggler on May 23, 1956, four summitters reached on the top of the Mount Everest respectively Ernst Schmied, Jürg Marmet, Dölf Reist, and Hansruedi von Gunten

1960s
1960 Chinese
1963 U.S. National Geographic Expedition
1963 First ascent by an American: Jim Whittaker, accompanied by Nawang Gombu Sherpa who later went on to become the first man to climb Everest twice in 1965; first ascent of the West Ridge on May 22 by Americans Tom Hornbein and Willi Unsoeld. Hornbein and Unsoeld descended by the South Col, making the ascent the first traverse of Everest. Lute Jerstad and Barry Bishop are the another summiteers. A total of six persons reach the summit, five Americans and one sherpa
1965 Indian Everest Expedition

1970s
1970 Japanese Alpine Club Mount Everest Expedition (1970 Mount Everest disaster)
1973 Italian Everest Expedition (I.E.E.)
1973 Japanese RCCII Everest Expedition
1975 Japanese Women's Everest Expedition
Junko Tabei: (Japan) became the first woman to reach the summit of Everest on 5/16/75 via the South-East Ridge route.
1975 Chinese Mount Everest expedition - North Col- North East Ridge
1975 British SW Face
1976 British and Nepalese Army expedition
1976 American Expedition - South East Ridge
1977 South Korean Expedition - South East Ridge
1978 Austrian Expedition - South East Ridge
1978 Franco-German Expedition headed by Dr. Karl Herrligkoffer
1979 Yugoslav Expedition along the West Ridge led by Tone Škarja
1979 German Expedition led by Gerhard Schmatz

1980s
1980 Polish National Expedition - South East Ridge
1980 Japanese Alpine Club Expedition - North East Ridge
1980 Spanish Expedition - South East Ridge
1980 Reinhold Messner - Solo - North Col/North Face
First to ascend alone and without supplementary oxygen – from base camp to summit - during the monsoon. He established a new route on the North Face.
1981 American Medical Expedition - South Pillar/South East Ridge
1982 Russian Expedition - South West Pillar
1982 Canadian Mount Everest Expedition
1982 Japanese Japanese Winter Expedition - South East Ridge
1983 German/American Expedition - South East Ridge
1983 American Expedition - East Face/South East Ridge
1983 Japanese Sangak-udoshikai Expedition - South East Ridge
1983 Japanese Yeti Dojin Expedition - South East Ridge
1983 Japanese Kamoshika Dojin Expedition - South East Ridge
1984 Bulgarian Expedition by the West Ridge
1984 Indian Everest Expedition 1984
1984 Australian Expedition - North Face/Norton Couloir
1984 Slovak Expedition - South Pillar, but descending the South east ridge
1984 Czechoslovak Expedition by South Pillar
1984 American Expedition - North Col/North Face
1985 Norwegian Expedition - South East Ridge
1985 Spanish Segunda Expedición caja de Barcelona al Everest Expedition - North East Ridge
1985 Japanese Uemura Filming Expedition - South East Ridge
1986 Canadian Expedition - West Ridge (Tibet)
1986 Franco/Swiss Expedition - North Face/Hornbein Couloir
1987 South Korean Expedition - South East Ridge
1988 Joint China-Japan-Nepal Expedition
1988 American Expedition - East Face/South Col
1988 The Australian Bicentennial Everest Expedition
1988 French Expedition - South East Ridge
1988 South Korean Expedition - South Pillar
1988 Spanish Expedition - South East Ridge
1988 New Zealand Expedition led by Rob Hall - South East Ridge
1988 Czechoslovak Expedition by Southwest Face, repeating the route of 1975 British Expedition without supplemental oxygen
1989 International Expedition - South East Ridge
1989 American Expedition - South East Ridge
1989 Polish Expedition - West Ridge/Hornbein Couloir
1989 Japanese Expedition - South East Ridge
1989 Mexican Expedition - South East Ridge
1989 South Korean Expedition - West Ridge (Nepal)

1990s
1990 Royal Nepalese Army Expedition - South East Ridge
1990 Earth Day 20 International Peace Climb
1990 American Expedition - South East Ridge
1990 International Expedition - South East Ridge
1990 American commercial Expedition - South East Ridge
1990 French Commercial	Expedition - South East Ridge
1990 French Expedition - South East Ridge
1990 South Korean/Japanese Expedition - South East Ridge
1990 Slovenian Expedition - South East Ridge
1991 Nepal Sherpa Youth Expedition - South East Ridge
1991 Sherpa Support/American Lhotse Expedition - South East Ridge
1991 American Expedition - South East Ridge
1991 Swedish Expedition - South East Ridge
1991 Italy/Czech Expedition - Norton
1991 International Expedition - North East Ridge
1991 Japanese Expedition - North East Ridge
1991 Spanish Valancian Ai Everest 91 Expedition - South East Ridge
1991 Russian-Of Friends and Romans: An Ascent of Everest Expedition - South East Ridge
1992 Indo-Tibetan Border Police Expedition to Mount Everest
Santosh Yadav became the second woman from India to reach the summit.
1992 First Indian Civilian Everest Expedition'1992 by Sports and Research Foundation, India
1992 Adventure Consultants New Zealand Expedition by Rob Hall - South East Ridge
1992 Dutch Expedition - South East Ridge
1992 Russian Mountain Climbers Sports Club VAZ Expedition - South East Ridge
1992 American Expedition - South East Ridge
1992 Chilean Sagarmtha Expedition - South East Ridge
1992 Spanish High Mountain Military Group Expedition - South East Ridge
1992 Chilean Chomolangma Kangshung Face Expedition - South East Ridge
1992 Spanish UDA 92 Expedition - South East Ridge
1992 Italian Mountain Equip Expedition - South East Ridge
1992 Luxembourg Fronco Expedition - South East Ridge
1992 German Expedition - South East Ridge
1992 International Expedition - South East Ridge
1992 Everest International Expedition - South East Ridge
1993 South Korean Expedition - North Col to South Col Traverse
1993 Nepalese Women San-Miguel Everest Expedition - South East Ridge
1993 Taiwan-Chinese Expedition - North Col - North East Ridge
1993 British Everest Expedition - South East Ridge
1993 American Alpine Ascent International Expedition - South East Ridge
1993 American Sagarmatha Expedition - South East Ridge
1993 Indo-Nepalese Everest Expedition led by Bachendri Pal - South East Ridge
Santosh Yadav became first woman to reach the top of Mount Everest twice
1993 Adventure Consultants New Zealand Hall & Ball Everest Expedition led by Rob Hall - South East Ridge
1993 Australian 40th Tashi Anniversary Expedition - South East Ridge
1993 Korean Women's Expedition - South East Ridge
1993 Lithuania Expedition - South East Ridge
1993 Russian Programma Piki Expedition - South East Ridge
1993 Korean Dongkuk Alpine Club Expedition - South East Ridge
1993 Spanish Everest Expedition - South East Ridge
1993 American Sagarmatha Expedition - South East Ridge
1993 Spanish Catalan Sagarmatha Cleaning & Climbing Expedition - South East Ridge
1993 USA Expedition - South East Ridge
1993 British Everest Expedition - South East Ridge
1993 Irish Everest Expedition - South East Ridge
1993 South Korean Everest Expedition - North Col - North East Ridge
1993 French Military Everest Lhotse Expedition Everest Expedition - South East Ridge
1993 Spanish Basque Everest Expedition - South East Ridge
1993 Himalayan Kingdoms Mt. Lhotse led by Stephen J. Bell - South East Ridge
1993 OTT Commercial Expedition led by Jon Tinker - North Col-North East Ridge 
1993 Japan Gunma Winter Mt. Sagarmatha S.W.F. Expedition 93/94 - South East Ridge
1994 British Mount Everest Medical Expedition led by Dr David Collier and Andrew Pollard as deputy leader.
1994 Japan University Expedition - South Pillar
1994 Taiwan Expedition - Std North up, Great Couloir Down
1994 Environmental Expedition led by Steve Goryl - South East Ridge
1994 Adventure Consultants expedition led by Rob Hall.
1994 Alpine Ascents International American Commercial Expedition led by Todd Burleson - South East Ridge
1994 International Mountain Guides (IMG) Expedition led by Eric Simonson - South East Ridge
1995 American Expedition led by Paul Pfau - North Col - North East Ridge
1995 Adventure Consultants expedition led by Rob Hall - South East Ridge
1995 Japanese Expedition - North East Ridge
1995 Russian Expedition - North Col - North East Ridge
1995 British Commercial Expedition - North Col - North East Ridge
1995 International Expedition - North Col - North East Ridge
1995 Taiwan Expedition - North Col - North East Ridge
1995 Brazil Himalayan Guides Expedition - North Col - North East Ridge
1995 OTT Expedition led by Jon Tinker - North Col - North East Ridge
1995 Latvia Expedition - North Col - North East Ridge
1995 Austrian Expedition - North Col - North East Ridge
1995 American On Sagarmatha Expedition - North Col - North East Ridge
1995 Condor Adventures Expedition - North Col - North East Ridge
1995 Commercial Expedition led by Russell Brice - North Col - North East Ridge
1995 South Korean Expedition - North Col - North East Ridge
1995 Korea Everest SW Face Expedition - SW Face
Misc. teams of the 1996 Mount Everest disaster
1996 Taiwan Everest Expedition - South East Ridge
1996 Mountain Madness Sagarmatha Environmental Expedition led by Scott Fischer - South East Ridge (Guiding tragedy)
1996 Adventure Consultants International Friendship Everest Expedition led by Rob Hall - South East Ridge (Guiding tragedy)
1996 Indo-Tibetan Border Police expedition to Mount Everest led by Mohindenr Singh - North Col - North East Ridge
In May 1996 expedition by the Indo-Tibetan Border Police to reach the summit of Mount Everest happened in the background of the 1996 Mount Everest disaster, and resulted in three members of the expedition dying. The expedition credited as being the first Indian ascent of Everest from the North Side.
Tsewang Samanla, Dorje Morup, and Tsewang Paljor all died on the way back. Until 2014, Paljor's body, now known as "Green Boots", served as a landmark for people to use to gauge their distance to the summit.
1996 Japanese Expedition - North Col - North East Ridge
1996 Norwegian Expedition - North Col - North East Ridge
1996 U K Expedition - North Col - North East Ridge
1996 Russian Expedition - North Col - North East Ridge
1996 Swedish Everest Expedition - South Pillar
1996 Imax Everest Filming Expedition led by David Breashears - South East Ridge
1996 Thieery Renard Expedition led by Thieery Renard - South East Ridge
1996 MC Expedition led by Peter Kowalzik - North Col - North East Ridge
1996 First South African Everest Expedition led by Ian Woodall - South East Ridge
1996 Indonesia Everest Expedition led by Clara Sumarwati - North East Ridge
Clara Sumarwati became the first Indonesian woman and first Indonesian to reach the summit.
1996 Korean Everest Expedition (Shoson University) - North East Ridge
1998 Expedition led by Rishikesh Yadav
1999 Expedition led by Santosh Yadav
1999 Mallory and Irvine Research Expedition

2000s
2000 Nepali Women Millennium Expedition
2001 Mallory and Irvine Research Expedition
2004 Greek Expedition
2004 Discovery Channel Expedition
2004 Connecticut Everest Expedition
2006 EverestMax
2006 David Sharp with Asian Trekking
2006 BSF Everest Expedition
2006 Philippine Mount Everest Expedition - South East Ridge
2007 Altitude Everest expedition
Indian Army Everest Expedition 2007
2008 Eco Everest Expeditions
2009 Western Washington University with J. All science expedition

2010s
2010 TOPtoTOP Global Climate Expedition
2013 50th Anniversary North Face-National Geographic Expeditions (National Geographic's 50th Anniversary Expedition)
2017 ONGC Everest Expedition
2017 Indian Navy Everest Expedition
2018 Ben Fogle and Victoria Pendleton's in support of The British Red Cross and the televised expedition was part of the 'Anything is Possible' initiative.
2019 Western Washington University with J. All science expedition

2020s
2020 Chinese expedition with more than two dozen Chinese climbers set off in April; only Chinese climbers would be permitted on Everest in the spring season.

See also
Timeline of climbing Mount Everest
List of Mount Everest records
List of Mount Everest summiters by number of times to the summit
List of 20th-century summiters of Mount Everest

References

Climbing and mountaineering-related lists
Mount Everest expeditions